The Jharkhand Anushilan Party, previously named Jharkhand Party (Aditya), is a political party in West Bengal, India. The party demands that Jangal Mahal be declared an autonomous area within West Bengal. Aditya Kisku is the general secretary of the party.

References

Political parties in West Bengal
Political parties with year of establishment missing